Khalid Abdulrahman Ibrahim Al-Koroni (born 31 December 1959) is a Saudi Arabian professional football coach and former player who played for Al-Riyadh.

Playing career 
Al-Koroni spent his whole playing career with hometown club Al-Riyadh and made his debut during the 1977–78 season. In his first season with the club, they managed to get promoted to the 1978–79 Saudi Premier League and reached the final of 1978 King Cup. During his playing career, Al-Koroni managed to get promoted to the Premier League four times with Al-Riyadh.

Managerial career

1990–1999 
In 1991, Al-Koroni announced his retirement and was appointed as assistant manager of Al-Riyadh. In 1992, Al-Koroni was appointed as caretaker before returning to his previous post following the appointment of Zé Mário.

On 6 December 1997, Al-Koroni was appointed as Al-Riyadh's manager until the end of the season following the sacking of Jean-Michel Cavalli. At the time of his appointment, Al-Riyadh sat at tenth with only 8 points picked up from 10 games. Al-Riyadh's form started to improve and Al-Koroni managed to lead Al-Riyadh to ninth, 4 points off the relegation zone. Al-Koroni also managed to lead Al-Riyadh to their second Crown Prince Cup final, when they beat Al-Shoulla in the semi-finals. In the final, Al-Ahli defeated Al-Riyadh 3–2, courtesy of a golden goal. After ensuring the club's survival, Al-Koroni's contract was renewed for another year. On 11 February 1999, Al-Koroni announced his resignation as manager following conflicts with several players of the team.

1999–2000 
On 24 February 1999, Al-Koroni was appointed as the manager of Al-Tai. At the time of his appointment, Al-Tai sat at ninth just four points above the relegation zone. Al-Koroni managed to finish eighth with Al-Tai and left following the expiration of his contract on 1 April 1999.

Al-Koroni was then appointed as assistant manager to Luisinho Lemos in the Saudi U23 national team. On 29 August 1999, Al-Koroni was appointed as head coach of the Saudi U23 national team following the sacking of Luisinho. Al-Koroni failed to qualify for the Olympics after finishing in second place, three points behind Kuwait in the qualifiers.

On 3 January 2000, Al-Koroni was appointed as the manager of Al-Shoulla until the end of the season.

On 6 February 2000, Al-Koroni left Al-Shoulla to manage the Saudi U17 national team. He was then made assistant following the appointment of Jean-Marie Conz.

2000–2005 
On 10 November 2000, Al-Koroni was appointed as the head coach of Al-Hazem. On 27 March 2001, Al-Koroni resigned due to personal reasons.

On 1 May 2001, Al-Koroni returned to manage Al-Shoulla for a second time. He managed to lead Al-Shoulla to a sixth-placed finish, their highest ever in the top flight. He left at the end of the season following the expiration of his contract.

On 21 May 2002, Al-Koroni returned to manage boyhood club Al-Riyadh for a third time. On 4 October 2002, Al-Koroni was sacked by Al-Riyadh.

On 8 October 2002, Al-Koroni was appointed as the manager of First Division club Al-Wehda. Al-Koroni managed to lead Al-Wehda to the First Division and gain promotion to the Premier League.

On 3 May 2003, Al-Koroni was loaned to Premier League side Al-Ittihad until the end of the season. Al-Koroni managed to win the Premier League title after defeating Al-Ahli 3–2 in the final. He became the first manager to win both the Premier League title and First Division title in one season. Al-Koroni also managed to win the 2003 Saudi-Egyptian Super Cup after defeating Ismaily 1–0 in the final.

Al-Koroni left Al-Ittihad following the expiration of his loan and returned to Al-Wehda.

On 2 August 2004, Al-Koroni was appointed as the manager of Al-Riyadh for the fourth time. On 4 February 2005, Al-Koroni was sacked by Al-Riyadh.

On 17 March 2005, Al-Koroni was appointed as the manager of First Division side Al-Hazem. Al-Koroni managed to lead Al-Hazem to their first First Division title as well as gain promotion to the top flight for the first time in the club's history.

2005–2014 
On 14 September 2005, Al-Koroni was appointed as the manager of Al-Nassr's U20 team. Following the sacking of Mariano Barreto, Al-Koroni was appointed as Al-Nassr's manager on 23 November 2005. On 15 January 2006, Al-Koroni resigned from his post after a 3–0 defeat to Al-Ahli.

On 12 February 2006, Al-Koroni was appointed as Al-Raed's manager until the end of the season.

On 4 December 2006, Al-Koroni returned to manage Al-Tai for the second time. On 1 February 2007, Al-Koroni was sacked after failing to achieve a single win.

On 1 March 2007, Al-Koroni was appointed as the manager of Al-Qadsiah until the end of the season. At the time of his appointment, Al-Qadsiah sat at 11th in the relegation zone. He managed to finish 10th and avoid relegation.

On 18 February 2008, Al-Koroni replaced Jan Versleijen as the manager of Al-Wehda.

On 13 February 2009, Al-Koroni returned to manage Al-Riyadh for the fifth time. He left at the end of the season following the expiration of his contract. On 11 January 2010, Al-Koroni was appointed as Al-Riyadh's manager for the sixth time.

On 30 March 2010, Al-Koroni was appointed as the manager of the Saudi U20 national team. He resigned from his post as Al-Riyadh's manager on 12 April 2010. He managed to lead them to the Round of 16 of the 2011 FIFA U-20 World Cup. He was then appointed as the manager of the Saudi U23 national team in 2012. He managed to win the 2012 GCC U-23 Championship and finish as runners-up in the 2013 AFC U-22 Championship.

2014–present 
On 1 March 2014, Al-Koroni was appointed as Al-Ittihad's manager following the sacking of Juan Verzeri. On 28 August 2014, he was sacked after Al-Ittihad were eliminated by Al Ain in the Quarter-finals of the 2014 AFC Champions League.

On 22 September 2014, Al-Koroni returned to manage Al-Wehda for the third time. He was sacked on 28 October 2014 after losing three matches and drawing one in four matches.

On 31 October 2015, Al-Koroni was appointed as Al-Shoulla's manager until the end of the season.

On 28 April 2016, Al-Koroni was appointed as Al-Batin's manager. He managed the team during the promotion play-offs against Al-Raed, which they lost 5–3 on aggregate.

On 6 November 2016, Al-Koroni returned to Al-Batin following Adel Abdel Rahman's sacking.

On 8 March 2018, Al-Koroni was appointed as Al-Shabab's manager following the sacking of José Carreño.

On 27 January 2019, Al-Koroni returned to manage Al-Riyadh for the seventh time. He resigned from his post on 15 October 2019.

On 26 February 2020, Al-Koroni was appointed as Hetten's manager until the end of the season. He resigned on 27 July 2020 whilst the season was put on hold due to the COVID-19 pandemic.

On 13 April 2022, Al-Koroni was appointed as Al-Kholood's manager until the end of the season. On 17 May 2022, Al-Kholood renewed Al-Koroni's contract until the end of the 2022–23 season. On 5 October 2022, Al-Koroni was sacked following a 2–0 defeat to Al-Sahel.

Managerial statistics

Honours

Player
Al-Riyadh
 Saudi First Division: 1977–78, 1988–89, runner-up 1979–80, 1982–83
 King Cup runner-up: 1978

Manager
Al-Riyadh
 Crown Prince Cup runner-up: 1998

Al-Wehda
 Saudi First Division: 2002–03

Al-Ittihad
 Saudi Premier League: 2002–03
 Saudi-Egyptian Super Cup: 2003

Al-Hazem
 Saudi First Division: 2004–05

Saudi Arabia U23
 GCC U-23 Championship: 2012

References

1959 births
Living people
Sportspeople from Riyadh
Association football midfielders
Saudi Arabian footballers
Saudi Arabian football managers
Al-Riyadh SC players
Al-Riyadh SC managers
Al-Ta'ee managers
Al-Shoulla FC managers
Al-Hazm FC managers
Al-Wehda Club (Mecca) managers
Ittihad FC managers
Al Nassr FC managers
Al-Raed FC managers
Al-Qadisiyah FC managers
Al Batin FC managers
Al Shabab FC (Riyadh) managers
Saudi Professional League managers
Saudi First Division League managers